Jay Mazur (born May 21, 1932) is an American labor leader. He was the last president of the International Ladies' Garment Workers' Union (ILGWU), serving from 1986 to 1995, and the first president of the Union of Needletrades, Industrial and Textile Employees (UNITE), serving from 1995 to 2001.

Biography

Jay Mazur was born in East Bronx, NY on May 21, 1932, the son of Simon Mazur, a cloak maker and union man who emigrated from Poland to New York in 19; his mother, Mollie, died when he was 11, leaving his father to raise four children - twin boys and two older girls.

After graduating from high school in 1951, Mazur began work in the Health and Welfare Department of New York City's dressmaker's Local 22. In 1955, Mazur entered the ILGWU's Training Institute, a 1-year intensive program to prepare students for staff appointments in the ILGWU, and was assigned as an organizer in the Upper South Department and the New England Region. After graduation in 1956, Mazur was assigned to Local 40, where he became Director of Organization and Education. In 1959, Mazur began working for Local 23, which later merged with Local 25 to become Local 23-25. Mazur began work as an organizer for the local in 1959, was elected as Assistant Manager in 1964, and manager in 1973. 

Mazur became a Vice-President of the International in 1977. During his tenure in Local 23 and 23-25, Mazur was involved in major organizing efforts, as well as significant social and educational programs for union members. He was manager of Local 23-25 in 1982, when thousands of workers in New York City's Chinatown went on strike to win a fair contract. Under his leadership, Local 23-25 established an Immigration Project to assist members and their families with legal and related immigration issues. While working for the union, Mazur earned his an undergraduate degree in Personnel and Labor Studies from City College of New York, and later a master's degree in Labor Studies from Rutgers University.

In 1983, Mazur was elected to the International's leadership as Secretary-Treasurer, and in 1986, he was elected to succeed Sol Chaikin as President of the ILGWU. During his tenure as President, Mazur led major campaigns to stem the decline of garment manufacturing in the United States. This included the creation of the ILGWU's Professional and Clerical Employees (PACE) Division and the Metro Organizing Department, the expansion of the Immigration Project to be national in scope, and the establishment of workers centers in major metropolitan centers. Mazur served on the Executive Councils of the AFL-CIO, and the AFL-CIO's Industrial Union Department of the AFL-CIO; in addition to his work in domestic and international labor federations, he has also served on numerous foundation boards and government commissions.

Under Mazur's leadership, the ILGWU merged with the Amalgamated Clothing and Textile Workers of America to form the Union of Needletrades, Industrial and Textile Employees (UNITE) in 1995. He served as the first president of UNITE, from 1995 until his retirement in 2001. In addition to his work for the ILGWU and UNITE, Mazur served on the Executive Council of the AFL-CIO, as well as the Industrial Union Department of the AFL-CIO. He is a member of the Executive Committee of the Jewish Labor Committee and President of the 21st Century ILGWU Heritage Fund.

Sources
Biography of Jay Mazur

External links
 Guide to the ILGWU. Jay Mazur papers. 5780/203. Kheel Center for Labor-Management Documentation and Archives, Martin P. Catherwood Library, Cornell University. 

American trade union leaders
International Ladies Garment Workers Union leaders
1932 births
City College of New York alumni
Rutgers University alumni
AFL–CIO people
Living people